Elín Metta Jensen (born 1 March 1995) is an Icelandic former footballer. She played her entire career as a striker for Valur. Elín was a part of Iceland's national team from 2012 to 2022 and represented her country at the 2013 and 2017 editions of the UEFA Women's Championship.

Club career
Elín has played for Valur since 2010. She made her Úrvalsdeild debut aged 15 in July 2010, scoring the fifth goal in Valur's 7–2 win over Haukar. In 2012, she scored 18 goals in 18 games to win the league's Golden Boot. Elín was voted Úrvalsdeild player of the year for the season of 2019, scoring 16 goals and providing 10 assists, a season that saw Valur win the title. Elín signed a new three-year contract with Valur in February 2020.

On 2 October 2022, Elín announced her retirement from football.

International career
Elín made her senior international debut for Iceland on 16 June 2012, aged 17, replacing record goalscorer Margrét Lára Viðarsdóttir after 75 minutes of a 3–0 friendly win over Hungary. Her first two goals came in a 5–0 victory over Malta on 19 June 2014. Elín played in a historic 3–2 win over Germany in the 2019 World Cup qualifiers, scoring one goal and providing two assists to her teammate Dagný Brynjarsdóttir. Elín was also instrumental in securing a place for Iceland in the UEFA Women's Euro 2022, scoring the winning goal against Slovakia at home and the equalizer against Sweden, also at home. She finished as the top goalscorer in group F in the UEFA Women's Euro 2021 qualifiers.
Elín was called up to be part of the national team for the UEFA Women's Euro 2013 and 2017.

Honours

Club
Valur
Winner
 Icelandic Champion 2010, 2019, 2021, 2022
 Icelandic Women's Cup: 2010, 2011, 2022
 Icelandic Women's Football League Cup: 2017
 Icelandic Women's Super Cup: 2022

Runner-up
 Icelandic Women's Cup: 2012
 Icelandic Women's Football League Cup: 2013, 2019
 Icelandic Women's Super Cup: 2012, 2020

Individual
 Úrvalsdeild Player of the Year: 2019
 Úrvalsdeild Golden Boot: 2012

Career statistics

Club

As of 20 August 2021

International goals
As of match played 22 September 2020. Iceland score listed first, score column indicates score after each Elín Jensen goal.

References

External links

 
 Profile at fussballtransfers.com 
 
 Profile at soccerdonna.de 
 
 

1995 births
Living people
Elin Metta Jensen
Elin Metta Jensen
Florida State Seminoles women's soccer players
Elin Metta Jensen
Expatriate women's soccer players in the United States
Elin Metta Jensen
Elin Metta Jensen
Women's association football forwards
Elin Metta Jensen
Elin Metta Jensen
UEFA Women's Euro 2022 players
UEFA Women's Euro 2017 players